Vina may refer to:

People 

 Émilie Vina (born 1982), French cross-country skier
 Ionuț Vînă (born 1995), Romanian footballer
 Vina Bovy (1900–1983), Belgian operatic soprano
 Vina Mazumdar (1927–2013), Indian academic and feminist
 Vina Morales (born 1975), Filipina singer and actress
 Vina Jie-Min Prasad, Singaporean science fiction and fantasy writer
 Vina Fay Wray (1907–2004), Canadian/American actress
 Vina (footballer), Brazilian footballer Vinícius Goes Barbosa de Souza (born 1991)
 Vina Bovy, Belgian operatic soprano Malvina Bovi Van Overberghe (1900–1983)
 Vina Panduwinata, stage name of Indonesian singer and songwriter Vina Dewi Sastaviyana (born 1959)
 Marcos Vinicius (fighter) (born 1979), Brazilian mixed martial artist; nicknamed Vina
 Victor Vina, French film actor Victor Emanuel Jules Vinatieri (1885–1961)

Places

Africa 
 Vina (Africa), once a city and diocese of Roman Africa, now a Latin Catholic titular bishopric
 Vina (department), a department of the Adamawa province in Cameroon
 Vina River, Cameroon

Europe 
 Vina, Croatia, a village near Vrgorac
 Vina (Knjaževac), Serbia, a village

United States 
 Vina, Alabama, a town
 Vina, California, a census-designated place in Tehama County
 La Vina, California, a census-designated place in Madera County

Other uses 
 Veena, also spelled vina, an Indian stringed musical instrument
 Vina (Star Trek), a character in the Star Trek franchise
 Vina, a walnut cultivar

See also 
 Veena (disambiguation)
 Viña (disambiguation)